Maria Elisabeth Lämmerhirt (24 February 1644, Erfurt – 1 May 1694, Eisenach) was the mother of Johann Sebastian Bach.

She was a daughter of Valentin Lämmerhirt (or Lemmerhirt, 1605–1665), a furrier and coachman in Erfurt. On 8 April 1668, she married her friend since childhood, Johann Ambrosius Bach. The couple left Erfurt in 1671 and settled in Eisenach, where in 1685 their eighth son, Johann Sebastian Bach, was born.

Her half-sister Martha Dorothea was the mother of composer and lexicographer Johann Gottfried Walther, who became a friend of Johann Sebastian.

Notes

Further reading

1644 births
1694 deaths
People from Erfurt
Bach family